Іrmino is a city in Kadiivka Municipality, Luhansk Oblast (region) of Ukraine. Population: , .

Since 2014, Irmino has been controlled by forces of the so-called Luhansk People's Republic and not by Ukrainian authorities.

Geography 
Irmino is located 55 km west of Luhansk. It is part of the agglomeration Alchevsk-Kadiivka, in Donbas. It is located on the banks of the river Luhan.

History 
Irmino was the first village of Petrovka/Petrivka (in ) founded in 1808 on the right bank of the Luhan by peasants from the Poltava region and renamed Irminka in 1898, or Irmino (Ірміно) around 1910, after the coal mine named after Irma, daughter of the mine owner. In 1936, the village achieved city status and took on the name Teplohirsk in 1977. On July 8, 2010 the town was renamed Irmino.

It was in Irmino, at the “Tsentralna-Irmino” mine, where he had been working since 1927, that Alexei Stakhanov managed to extract  of coal, i.e. 14 times the norm, on the night of August 30 to August 31, 1935. At the time, the village of Irmino depended on Kadiivka, and Stakhanov's registration would have been made at the Tsentralna-Irmino mine in Kadiivka.

Name 
1808 — 1900 — Petrovka (Petrovka),
1900— 1962 — Brother (Irmino),
1977 — 2010 — Teplohirsk (Теплогірсь)

Demographics 
 1923 - 2,794
 1926 - 5,276
 1939 - 15,327
 1959 - 21,512
 1979 - 19,090
 1989 - 18,549
 2001 - 13,053
 2012 - 10,200
 2013 - 10,044
 2014 - 9,886
 2015 - 9,764
 2016 - 9,687
 2021 - 9,343

Transport 
Irmino was 116 km from Louhansk by rail and 75 km by road.

References

1808 establishments in Ukraine
Cities in Luhansk Oblast
Cities of district significance in Ukraine
Populated places established in 1808
Populated places established in the Russian Empire